The Jersey cricket team toured Qatar in October 2019 to play a three-match Twenty20 International (T20I) series. Jersey used the series as preparation for the 2019 ICC T20 World Cup Qualifier. The matches were played at the West End Park International Cricket Stadium in Doha.

Squads

T20I series

1st T20I

2nd T20I

3rd T20I

Notes

References

External links
 Series home at ESPN Cricinfo

Associate international cricket competitions in 2019–20